Lac Vert is a lake in Haut-Rhin, France. At an elevation of 1044 m, its surface area is 0.072 km².

Lakes of Haut-Rhin
Glacial lakes of France